Inhale/Exhale is the second full-length release by UK-based band, Random Hand.

Track listing
I, Human
The Right Reasons
British
Anger Management
Roots in the Crowd
Devil's Little Guinea Pigs
"In"
Mass Producing Monsters
For Roni
A Spider in the Sink
The Eyeballs Of War
What it Takes

References

2009 albums
Random Hand albums